Jean-François Parigi (born 25 January 1960) is a French politician for The Republicans who served as the member of the National Assembly for Seine-et-Marne's 6th constituency from 2017 to 2021.

References 

1960 births
Living people
21st-century French politicians
People from Châtenay-Malabry
People from Hauts-de-Seine
People from Seine-et-Marne
French bankers
Deputies of the 15th National Assembly of the French Fifth Republic
Union for a Popular Movement politicians
The Republicans (France) politicians
Politicians from Île-de-France
French people of Italian descent
Members of Parliament for Seine-et-Marne